Always Coming Home is a 1985 science fiction novel by American writer Ursula K. Le Guin. It is in parts narrative, pseudo-textbook and pseudo-anthropologist's record. It describes the life and society of the Kesh people, a cultural group who live in the distant future long after modern society has collapsed. It is presented by Pandora, who seems to be an anthropologist or ethnographer from the readers' contemporary culture, or a culture very close to it. Pandora describes the book as a protest against contemporary civilization, which the Kesh call "the Sickness of Man".

Setting
The book's setting is a time so post-apocalyptic that no cultural source can remember the apocalypse, though a few folk tales refer to our time. The only signs of our civilization that have lasted into their time are indestructible artefacts such as styrofoam and a self-manufacturing, self-maintaining, solar-system-wide computer network. There has been a great sea level rise since our time, flooding much of northern California, where the story takes place.

The Kesh use technological inventions of civilization such as writing, steel, guns, electricity, trains, and a computer network (see below). However, unlike one of their neighboring societies – the Dayao or Condor People – they do nothing on an industrial scale, reject governance, have no non-laboring caste, do not expand their population or territory, consider disbelief in what we consider “supernatural” absurd, and deplore human domination of the natural environment. Their culture blends millennia of human economic culture by combining aspects of hunter-gatherer, agricultural, and industrial societies, but rejects cities (literal “civilization”). In fact, what they call “towns” would count as villages for the reader – a dozen or a few-dozen multi-family or large family homes. What they call “war” is a minor skirmish over hunting territories, and is considered a ridiculous pastime for youngsters, since an adult person should not throw his life away.

Pandora observes that a key difference between the Kesh and the readers' [her?] society is the size of their population: "There are not too many of them.".  Their low population density means that they can feed themselves from their land. The Kesh maintain this low population without coercion, which would be antithetical to their loosely organized society.  They carry a large accumulation of genetic damage, which leads to fewer successful pregnancies and higher infant mortality.  They also have social taboos against multiple siblings and early pregnancies; a third child is considered shameful, and the Dayao's practice of large families is referred to as "incontinence". Abortions are practiced freely.

Summary
The book is divided into two parts: The first part consists mostly of Kesh texts and records of oral performances, interspersed with Pandora's commentary, accounts of a few aspects of Kesh life, and personal essays. The longest text is a personal history narrated by a woman called Stone Telling.  Stone Telling's autobiography fills less than a third of the book, told in three sections with large gaps filled with other material.  The second part, called "The Back of the Book", contains a few Kesh texts but consists mostly of Pandora's accounts of various aspects of Kesh life.

Stone Telling recounts how she spent her childhood with her mother's people in the Valley, as a very young woman lived several years with her father's people in The City, and escaped from it with her daughter, who was born there. The two societies are contrasted through her narrative: the Kesh are peaceable and self-organized, whereas the Condor people of The City are rigid, patriarchal, hierarchical, militaristic, and expansionist.

The next longest piece in the main part, in the section "Eight Life Stories", is the novelette "The Visionary", which was published as a stand-alone story in Omni in 1984. This part also includes history and legends, myths, plays, a chapter of a novel, and song lyrics and poetry. Some editions of the book were accompanied by a tape of Kesh music and poetry.

A number of these are attributed by Pandora to a Kesh woman named Little Bear Woman; these are:
 Shahugoten. As told by Little Bear Woman of Sinshan to the Editor pp. 57–59 [a legend]
 Coming Home to Up the Hill House. By Little Bear Woman p. 258 [a poem]
 The Writer to the Morning in Up the Hill House in Sinshan. By Little Bear Woman p. 258 [a poem]
 A Song to Up the Hill House in Sinshan. By Little Bear Woman p. 259 [a poem]
 Some of the paths around Sinshan Creek. A Kesh map of the watershed of Sinshan Creek, given to the Editor by Little Bear Woman of Sinshan.

"The Back of the Book", about a fifth of the number of pages, presents cultural lore, with the format and attributions or annotations that an ethnographic fieldworker might make. It includes discussions of village layout and landscaping, family and professional guilds, recipes, medical care, yearly ritual dances, and language.

Awards
The novel received the Janet Heidinger Kafka Prize and was a runner up for the National Book Awards.

Literary significance and criticism 
It has been noted that Always Coming Home underscores Le Guin's long-standing anthropological interests. The Valley of the Na [River] is modeled on the landscape of California's Napa Valley, where Le Guin spent her childhood when her family was not in Berkeley.

Like much of Le Guin's work, Always Coming Home follows Native American themes. According to Richard Erlich, "Always Coming Home is a fictional retelling of much in A. L. Kroeber's [Ursula's father] monumental Handbook of the Indians of California." There are also some elements retrieved from her mother's The Inland Whale (Traditional narratives of Native California), such as the importance of the number nine, and the map of the Na Valley which looks like the Ancient Yurok World. There are also Taoist themes: the heyiya-if looks like the taijitu, and its hollow center (the "hinge") is like the hub of the wheel as described in the Tao Te Ching. Le Guin had described herself "as an unconsistent Taoist and a consistent un-Christian".

One of its earliest reviews, by Samuel R. Delany in The New York Times, called it "a slow, rich read... [Le Guin's] most satisfying text among a set of texts that have provided much imaginative pleasure"

Dave Langford reviewed Always Coming Home for White Dwarf #82, and stated that "Among many rich strangenesses it also includes a critique of its own improbabilities (as seen through twentieth-century eyes)."

Box set and soundtrack
A box set edition of the book, comes with an audiocassette entitled Music and Poetry of the Kesh, featuring 10 musical pieces and 3 poetry performances by Todd Barton. The book contains 100 original illustrations by Margaret Chodos. As of 2017, the soundtrack can be purchased separately in MP3 format. A vinyl record was also released, together with a digital album for streaming and download in several formats. That combination sold out, but the digital album by itself remains available, and a second pressing of the vinyl, plus the digital, was scheduled to ship "on or around 25 May 2018".

Stage performance
A stage version of Always Coming Home was mounted at Naropa University in 1993 (with Le Guin's approval) by Ruth Davis-Fyer. Music for the production was composed and directed by Brian Mac Ian, although it was original music and not directly influenced by Todd Barton's work.

Publication history
 Original hardcover release (boxed, with audiocassette), 1985 
 Original paperback (boxed, with audiocassette), 1985 
 Mass-market Bantam Spectra paperback, 1986 
 Trade paperback from the University of California Press, February 2001. Paperback, 534 pages.  (as part of a series of literature pieces set in California) - the book had been out of print for many years when this was released.
 Library of America hardcover edition, 2019, 800 pages.  Features new excerpts from the Kesh novel Dangerous People and other new material.
 Harper Perennial paperback, 2023

Influence
John Scalzi, one-time president of the Science Fiction and Fantasy Writers of America, wrote, in his introduction to the 2016 edition, that he discovered the book as a teenager, and calls it "a formative book...sunk deep in [his] bones", one to endlessly return to, always coming home.

Notes

References

Sources

Further reading

External links

 (snippet and paywall)

1985 American novels
1985 science fiction novels
Anarchist fiction
Environmental fiction books
Novels by Ursula K. Le Guin
American post-apocalyptic novels
Utopian novels
Novels set in California